Bob Lanier Public Works Building is a  tall skyscraper in Houston, Texas. It was completed in 1968 and has 27 floors. It is the 41st tallest building in the city. Eero Saarinen's CBS Building in New York City inspired the design for this building. It was named after Houston mayor Bob Lanier who served between 1992 and 1998.

The building is located one block from Houston City Hall and Hermann Square. It is bounded by Louisiana, Rusk, Smith, and Walker Streets.

History
The Rice Hotel Family Laundry formerly stood where the Lanier building is today.

This building was previously the Houston Lighting & Power office building. In 1999 the City of Houston, which had acquired the building, renovated it for $43 million to house city government offices. It was previously known as the Electric Building.

The renovation occurred under the direction of Mayor Lanier.

Departments
The main office of Houston Public Works is in the Lanier Building. Divisions of the Mayor's Office at the Lanier Building include 3-1-1 (5th Floor) and Office of Business Opportunity (7th Floor).

See also

List of tallest buildings in Houston

References

External links

Emporis
Skyscraperpage

Skyscraper office buildings in Houston
Government buildings completed in 1968
Buildings and structures in Houston